Bruce Thomas is an American actor. He is well known for being the motion capture actor of Master Chief in Halo 4, Halo 5: Guardians and Halo Infinite as well as portraying Russell Adler in Call of Duty: Black Ops Cold War. He first came to prominence for portraying the character of Batman in a series of commercials for General Motors' OnStar service that aired from 2000 to 2002.

Career
He was featured in Legally Blonde, as well as its sequel Legally Blonde 2: Red, White & Blonde, as the "UPS guy". He was featured in the 2008 film Babysitter Wanted. He co-starred on the ABC Family original series Kyle XY as Stephen Trager from 2006 to 2009. He starred as JP Gratton in the episode "The He in the She" in the series Bones on October 8, 2008.

Thomas has also been featured in the sitcom Wings as well as on Weeds. He most recently provided the voices of Atrocitus in Green Lantern: Emerald Knights, Ezra Loomis in Gears of War: Judgement, Desaad in Justice League: War, and James Gordon in Son of Batman.

He provided motion capture for Spartan John-117, the protagonist of the video game Halo 4 (2012), also doing so for Halo 5: Guardians (2015) and Halo Infinite (2021).

It has been erroneously reported in the past that Thomas played Batman for the pilot and premiere of The WB's Birds of Prey TV series. Thomas personally dispelled this fact during a podcast interview.

Filmography

Film

Television

Video games

References

External links
 
 BatPodcast interview with Bruce Thomas

Living people
American male film actors
American male soap opera actors
American male television actors
American male video game actors
American male voice actors
Place of birth missing (living people)
20th-century American male actors
21st-century American male actors
Year of birth missing (living people)